Stephen M Irwin (born December, 1966) is an Australian screenwriter, producer and novelist, best known for Harrow (2018) and Secrets & Lies (2014).

Biography
Irwin was born in Brisbane, Queensland and is the second youngest of six children. He graduated from the Queensland College of Art with tertiary qualifications in Film and Television production.
  Irwin continues to live in Brisbane and centres many of his stories in fictionalised Brisbane settings.

Films & Television

Novels

Irwin is the author of two supernatural thrillers The Dead Path (2010) and The Broken Ones (2011). The Dead Path was named Top Horror Title in the American Library Association's 2011 reading list and won the Doubleday Book of the Month Club First Fiction Award 2010.

Short Stories & Poetry
Irwin has written several short stories and poems, winning awards both Australia and overseas including The Write Stuff and New Millennium Writings.

References

External links
 
 Official site

21st-century Australian novelists
Australian male novelists
People from Brisbane
Australian film directors
1966 births
Living people
21st-century Australian male writers